Moussa Amba Cissè Konè (born 19 November 2000) is a Ivorian footballer who plays as a midfielder.

Career
As a youth player, Konè joined the youth academy of Italian Serie A side Parma.

Before the 2021 season, he was sent on loan to IFK Mariehamn in Finland. On 12 February 2021, he debuted for IFK Mariehamn during a 0–2 Finnish Cup loss to Inter (Turku).

On 26 July 2021, he was loaned to Serie C club Pro Sesto.

Career statistics

References

External links
 
  

2000 births 
Living people 
Ivorian footballers
IFK Mariehamn players
Pro Sesto 2013 players
Association football midfielders 
Ivorian expatriate footballers
Expatriate footballers in Italy
Ivorian expatriate sportspeople in Italy
Expatriate footballers in Finland
Ivorian expatriate sportspeople in Finland